Aerolíneas Peruanas S.A. (also known as APSA or the English translation Peruvian Airlines) was an airline from Peru, serving as flag carrier of the country from 1956 to 1971. Headquartered in Lima, it operated a network of scheduled passenger flights to major places in Latin America, as well as the United States, out of its hub at Jorge Chávez International Airport.

History
APSA was founded by C. W. Shelton on September 16, 1956, with 77 percent of the company's shares spread amongst private Peruvian investors. Flight operations were launched on September 17, 1957, on the Lima to Santiago and Miami routes. Originally not a member of the International Air Transport Association (IATA was only joined in 1966), APSA could significantly undercut the usual airline fares for flights between South America and the USA. To strengthen its market position, APSA went into a partnership with Transportes Aéreos Nacionales and Compañía Ecuatoriana de Aviación.

The Douglas DC-6 being the aircraft most commonly used with the airline in the early 1960s, Aerolíneas Peruanas joined the jet age on December 1, 1963 with the introduction of the Convair 990 Coronado. During those years, the network was greatly expanded, which culminated in the launch of transatlantic flights using the Douglas DC-8 by the end of the decade.

In the early 1970s, APSA found itself in a worsening financial situation. Plans for a take-over by the Peruvian government and Spanish national airline Iberia failed, so the company was forced to cease all flight operations on May 2, 1971.

Destinations
APSA offered scheduled passenger flights to the following destinations:

Fleet

Over the years, APSA operated the following aircraft types:

Accidents and incidents
On January 11, 1969, a Convair 990 Coronado was hijacked en route a flight from Panama City to Miami and forced to divert to Cuba. At that time, such United States-Cuba hijackings had become common occurrences.

See also
List of defunct airlines of Peru

References

Defunct airlines of Peru
Airlines established in 1956
Airlines disestablished in 1971